Palam is a small village 8 km. from district Rajauri, Jammu and Kashmir, India. It has many schools like Nawaz Public Higher Secondary School Palam Rajauri and also present two other institute namely Azad Public High School palm Rajauri and Govt. High School Palam Rajauri Totally three Higher-level school are present this area. Palam is a small but beautiful village with a population of about 2900. Hindu and Islam are being adopted by the local. Muslim population is more than Hindus. Gojri and Pahari are two locally speaking languages.

It is located on the bank of Khandal river. It has h both hilly and plain areas. Maize, rice and wheat are produced there.

It is connected to the Rajouri city through Rajouri_Budhal highway.

Geography of Jammu and Kashmir